Michael Garrick MBE (30 May 1933 – 11 November 2011) was an English jazz pianist and composer, and a pioneer in mixing jazz with poetry recitations and in the use of jazz in large-scale choral works.

Biography
Garrick was born in Enfield, Middlesex, and educated at University College, London, from which he graduated in 1959 with a BA in English literature. As a student there he formed his first quartet, featuring vibraphonist Peter Shade. Recordings of this are on HEP (Chronos and Silhouette, released on Gearbox vinyl). Aside from some lessons at the Ivor Mairants School of Dance Music, Garrick was "an entirely self-taught musician" (he had been expelled from Eleanor B. Franklin-Pike's piano lessons for quoting from "In the Mood" at a pupils' concert), though he attended Berklee College, Boston, as a mature student in the 1970s.

Soon after graduating, Garrick became the musical director of "Poetry & Jazz in Concert", a roadshow devised by poet and publisher Jeremy Robson, and involving writers as diverse as Laurie Lee, Adrian Mitchell, Vernon Scannell, Spike Milligan, Dannie Abse, and John Smith. Garrick's quintet at this time included Joe Harriott and Shake Keane. Garrick came to special prominence in the British contemporary jazz world initially as the pianist with the Don Rendell–Ian Carr quintet from 1965 to 1969, and led his own sextet from 1966.

Garrick is perhaps best known for his jazz-choral works, the first of which he started in 1967. Jazz Praises, an extended religious work for his sextet and a large choir, was performed at St. Paul's Cathedral in London, and elsewhere. With poet John Smith he produced a series of such works, starting in 1969 with Mr Smith's Apocalypse for sextet, speakers, and chorus, which had its premiere at the Farnham Festival. The culmination of this partnership was A Zodiac of Angels, a choral jazz ballet performed opposite Carmina Burana under the baton of Victor Fox in the Opera Theatre Manchester in January 1988 and using symphony orchestra, seven jazz soloists including Norma Winstone, full choir and a dance company. Indian classical music has influenced many of his compositions.

Aside from his performing, recording, and composing, Garrick was heavily involved in jazz education, and held teaching posts at the Royal Academy of Music and at Trinity College of Music, London; he continued to teach at summer schools, both for the Guildhall School of Music and on his own Jazz Academy Vacation Courses, from 1989 at Beechwood in Tunbridge Wells. For many years he took his trio into schools presenting interactive events to introduce children to jazz.

His own record label, Jazz Academy Records, features many albums by his Michael Garrick Jazz Orchestra and has trio, solo, quartet and other small groupings, some including singers Norma Winstone, Anita Wardell and Jacqui Dankworth. In 2010, Garrick began a collaboration with vocalist Nette Robinson. At the time of his death he had also begun to develop work with a quartet including vibraphonist Jim Hart, which would have reworked some of the music of the Modern Jazz Quartet and would have provided an echo of his own first quartet, half a century earlier. That year, he also participated in the release of a 1964 recording, The Girl with Brown Hair, featuring his trio (with Colin Barnes on drums and Dave Green on bass) backing Dick Morrissey.

Garrick was appointed MBE in the 2010 Birthday Honours. He published his autobiography Dusk Fire: Jazz in English Hands, co-written with Trevor Bannister, in the same year.

Garrick died on 11 November 2011 after suffering heart problems for some years.

Discography

As leader

Main sources:

Almost all of Garrick's early recordings have been reissued on CD, especially through the Vocalion label. Moonscape was reissued in 2007 on Trunk Records. Albums from the 1990s to 2010 appeared mainly on his Jazz Academy label.

With the Rendell–Carr Quintet
1966: Dusk Fire
1968: Phase III
1969: Live
1969: Change Is

Compositions
Praises: a miscellany of religious texts and images for jazz group, organ, and chorus. Recorded in 1965: Simon Preston (organ), Louis Halsey's Elizabethan Singers, and jazz quintet with Joe Harriott (alto sax) and Shake Keane (trumpet)
Mr Smith's Apocalypse: cantata (poems by John Smith). Commission from Farnham Festival, 1969. Same forces as Praises, plus readers.  Recorded in 1970 with the Garrick septet.
Judas Kiss: the Passion of Christ. Text compiled from the four gospels. Commission from Nottingham Festival, 1971. Same forces as Mr Smith's Apocalypse, with string orchestra added in 1990.  Not commercially recorded.
A Hobbit Suite or Gemstones: suite based on J. R. R. Tolkien The Hobbit, in nine sections. Commission from Mersey Arts, 1973 for jazz sextet, including the voice of Norma Winstone. Later expanded for jazz orchestra. Recorded in 1994 (selections from expanded version).
Jazz Portraits: an ongoing project from 1975, depicting figures from jazz such as Duke Ellington, John Coltrane, Dizzy Gillespie, McCoy Tyner, Thelonious Monk, and Bill Evans; for large and small ensembles.
Underground Streams: an after-death soliloquy, with interludes from angels and other heavenly beings. Based on Rudolf Steiner's 1912 lecture-cycle Life between Death and Rebirth. Commission from the Jazz Centre Society, London, 1978. Forces: voice, guitar, and piano. First performance at South Bank Centre, June 1978 with Norma Winstone (voice), Phil Lee (guitar), and Garrick (piano).  Not commercially recorded; broadcast on BBC Radio 3.
Hardy Country: suite for small or large ensemble, with or without vocal part; in nine self-contained movements, plus three poem settings for speaker. Commission from South-West Arts and Eldridge Pope, brewers, of Dorchester. First performance June 1990 in the Thomas Hardy Hall by jazz quartet with Norma Winstone. Later expanded for jazz orchestra. Selections of expanded version recorded in 1994.
A Zodiac of Angels: suite of twelve pieces, depicting the situation and function of twelve heavenly beings as defined in A Dictionary of Angels by Gustav Davidson; selected and turned into verse by John Smith. Commission from Manchester Education Authority for symphony orchestra, six jazz instrumental soloists, jazz singer, chorus, and soloists. First performance at Royal Northern College of Music Opera Theatre, January 1988 in a fully staged (dance) version.
The Royal Box: suite in nine movements based on phrases connected with royalty (e.g., "The Old Pretender", "The Royal Prerogative", "A Lady in Waiting", etc.). Inspired by the media treatment of the British Royal Family, in particular Prince Charles and Princess Diana. In two versions: piano/bass/drums trio and jazz orchestra. Trio version recorded complete; selections of jazz-orchestra version recorded.
Bovingdon Poppies: oratorio of poem "Bovingdon Poppies" (a poem by Eva Travers), for chorus, soloists, jazz sextet, and string orchestra. First performance: Remembrance Day, November 1993.

Autobiography
Michael Garrick, Dusk Fire: Jazz in English Hands (with Trevor Bannister). Earley, Reading: Springdale Publishing, 2010.

Other sources
Coleridge Goode and Roger Cotterrell, Bass Lines: A Life in Jazz. London: Northway Publications, 2002.
Alan Robertson, Joe Harriott: Fire in His Soul, 2nd edn. London: Northway Publications, 2011.

References

External links

Michael Garrick selected works at Jazzscript
Michael Garrick discography at Jazzscript
Michael Garrick Interview with Dennis Harrison at Jazzscript, March 2003
Michael Garrick on BBC Radio 3 Jazz Legends programme, presented by Julian Joseph, 1 July 2005.

1933 births
2011 deaths
Academics of the Royal Academy of Music
Alumni of University College London
Berklee College of Music alumni
English jazz bandleaders
English jazz composers
Male jazz composers
English male composers
English jazz pianists
Members of the Order of the British Empire
People from Enfield, London
20th-century British pianists
20th-century English musicians
British male pianists
20th-century British male musicians
New Jazz Orchestra members
Hep Records artists